Séjourné is a surname. Notable people with the surname include:

Emmanuel Séjourné (born 1961), French composer and percussionist
Laurette Séjourné (1911–2003), Mexican archeologist and ethnologist
Paul Séjourné (1851–1939), French engineer
Stéphane Séjourné (born 1985), French lawyer and politician